Afterhours is an Italian alternative rock band. The band was named after the Velvet Underground song of the same name.

Biography
The Afterhours were formed in 1985 in Milan around Manuel Agnelli, a Velvet Underground fan. They debuted in 1987 with the single My bit boy, followed a year later by the EP All Good Children Go to Hell.
The band has released two albums and two EPs in English. Since Germi (1995), the group switched to Italian language, except for Ballads for Little Hyenas, produced by Afghan Whigs leader Greg Dulli, who also played with the group in a 2006 tour in the United States. 
Afterhours also served as the Italian backing band to Greg Dulli and Mark Lanegan’s Gutter Twins project and Agnelli co-wrote two songs with Dulli on the Twilight Singers album Powder Burns.
In 2009, the band won the "Mia Martini" Critics Award at the Sanremo Music Festival. In the same year they released the compilation "Il paese è reale" ("The country is real") aiming to advance the Italian indie rock scene.

In 2014 the band released a double special edition of their most famous album Hai paura del buio?, containing a Remastered version of the original album and a new disc (called Reloaded) where every song was reinterpreted by a different artist, including John Parish, Afghan Whigs, Mark Lanegan, Damo Suzuki, Nic Cester and Joan as Policewoman.

Discography

Albums 
1990 - During Christine's Sleep (Vox Pop)
1993 - Pop Kills Your Soul (Vox Pop)
1995 - Germi (Vox Pop)
1997 - Hai paura del buio? (Mescal Records)
1999 - Non è per sempre (Mescal Records)
2002 - Quello che non c'è (Mescal Records)
2005 - Ballate per piccole iene (Mescal Records)
2006 - Ballads for Little Hyenas (Mescal Records) with Greg Dulli
2008 - I milanesi ammazzano il sabato (Universal Records)
2012 - Padania (Artist First)
2016 - Folfiri o Folfox

Live albums 
2001 -  (Mescal) 2 cd

Compilation albums 
2008 - Cuori e demoni (EMI)
2016 - The Best Of (EMI)

EPs 
1988 - All the Good Children Go to Hell (Toast Records)
1991 - Cocaine Head (Vox Pop)
2008 - Le sessioni ricreative (Universal)
2012 - Meet Some Freak On Route 66

Singles
"Shadowplay"
"Ossigeno"
"Germi"
"Dentro Marilyn"
"Voglio una pelle splendida"
"Male di miele"
"Sui giovani d'oggi ci scatarro"
"Non è per sempre"
"Baby fiducia"
"Bianca"
"La verità che ricordavo"
"La sinfonia dei topi"
"Quello che non c'è"
"Non sono immaginario"
"Gioia e rivoluzione"
"La vedova bianca"
"White Widow"
"È solo febbre"
"Pochi istanti nella lavatrice"
"Riprendere Berlino"
"I Milanesi Ammazzano il Sabato"
"Musa di nessuno"
"Il paese è reale"
"La Tempesta è in Arrivo"
"Padania"
"Spreca Una Vita"
"Il Mio Popolo si Fa"
"Non Voglio Ritrovare il Tuo Nome"
"Se Io Fossi il Giudice"

Other 
2009 - Afterhours presentano: Il paese è reale (19 artisti per un paese migliore?) (Casasonica)
2009 - Domani 21/04.09 (SugarMusic)  Artisti Uniti Per L'Abruzzo
2009 - Adesso è facile performed by Mina feat. Afterhours

DVDs 
2007 - Non Usate Precauzioni/Fatevi Infettare (1985-1997) (Virgin-EMI)
2007 - Io Non Tremo (1997-2006) (Virgin Records|Virgin-EMI)
2014 - Hai paura del buio? Il film. (Feltrinelli)

Cover versions

Released songs 
21st Century Schizoid Man - King Crimson (Cocaine Head)
Gioia E Rivoluzione - Area (Gioia E Rivoluzione)
Green River - Creedence Clearwater Revival (All the Good Children Go to Hell)
Hey Bulldog - The Beatles (Pop Kills Your Soul)
Jealous Guy - John Lennon (Sui Giovani D'Oggi Ci Scatarro Su)
La Canzone Di Marinella - Fabrizio De André (Gioia E Rivoluzione)
La Canzone Popolare - Ivano Fossati (Gioia E Rivoluzione)
Mio Fratello È Figlio Unico - Rino Gaetano (Germi)
On Time - Bee Gees (Pop Kills Your Soul)
Shadowplay - Joy Division (Something About Joy Division - Tribute To Joy Division)
State Trooper - Bruce Springsteen (Male Di Miele)
The Bed - Lou Reed (Ballads for Little Hyenas)
You Know You're Right - Nirvana (I Milanesi Ammazzano Il Sabato)

Live performances 
A Day in the Life - The Beatles
Across the Universe - The Beatles
Adam Raised a Cain - Bruce Springsteen
Atmosphere - Joy Division
Baby Face - Lou Reed
...Baby One More Time - Britney Spears
Bad America - Gun Club
Bianco Natale
Billie Jean - Michael Jackson
By This River - Brian Eno
Cortez the Killer - Neil Young
Dancing Barefoot - Patti Smith
Deep Hit of Morning Sun - Primal Scream
Down on the Street - The Stooges
Drive All Night - Bruce Springsteen
For What It's Worth - Buffalo Springfield
Heart-Shaped Box - Nirvana
Helter Skelter - Beatles
Hey Joe - Jimi Hendrix
I Wanna Be Your Dog - The Stooges
Judy Blue Eyes - Crosby, Stills, Nash & Young
Lilac Wine - Jeff Buckley
Live and Let Die - Paul McCartney
Mind Games - John Lennon
My Generation - The Who
Ooh La La - The Faces
Quicksand - David Bowie
Satellite of Love - Lou Reed
Search & Destroy - The Stooges
Sweet Jane - Velvet Underground
The Long and Winding Road - The Beatles
T.V. Eye - The Stooges
Walk on the Wild Side - Lou Reed
Wave of Mutilation - Pixies

See also
 Italian rock
 "Green River" (in "All the Good Children Go to Hell") is a song by American rock band Creedence Clearwater Revival.
 "Shadowplay" is an acoustic remake of the Joy division song (included in the compilation Tribute to Joy Division).

References

External links
 Official Site
 Official Site

1985 establishments in Italy
Italian alternative rock groups
Italian indie rock groups
Musical groups established in 1985
Musical groups from Milan
Universal Records artists